Nasrani is a 2007 Indian Malayalam-language political thriller film directed by Joshiy, produced by Rajan Thaliparambu, written by Ranjith and starring Mammootty. The film tells the story of an Achayan from a Syrian Orthodox family in Central Travancore. K.P.A.C. Lalitha won the Asianet Film Award for Best Supporting Actress for her role.

Plot
The story begins on the eve of the wedding of David John Kottarathil and Sara Eapen. The two were childhood sweethearts, both hailing from rich planter families in the small but affluent town of Kottayam, Kerala. While both families are celebrating in their own homes, Sara's father Eapen is visibly disturbed. He has just received a phone call from Alice, his mistress, who is demanding public acknowledgement of their relationship. She wants to attend the wedding of David and Sara, as a means to achieve this. Eapen, who is a rich planter, is at risk of losing his good name in society, despite having generously provided for Alice and their daughter thus far. He offers to pay for her silence with a bigger bungalow and his estates in a far-away town of Chikmaglur. He requests John Kottarathil, his best friend - whose son is set to marry Sara the next day - to accompany him while talking to his mistress. John requests the help of M C Paul, a rising politician and Eapen's brother-in-law to aid in the negotiation. The trio meet the mistress to discuss terms, but in a fit of rage, a drunk Eapen ends up shooting her. Eapen also tries to kill his illegitimate daughter, the nine year old Annie but John stops him. In the struggle that follows, Eapen is also shot. John looks at Paul for assistance, but is met with a helpless silence.

Ten years later, John is retelling this story to the jailor Rajeevan, who points out that John's defense in court was half-hearted and that he seems uninterested in parole despite possibly being eligible for it. John confirms this, saying he feels guilty for Eapen's death, although it was a genuine accident while saving Annie. Further, he reveals that Paul had requested that his presence at the scene of crime be kept a secret, lest it should affect his image and political prospects.

The marriage of David and Sara never happened, primarily because Sara's mother is against her marrying David, whose father John was responsible for Eapen's death. She even believes John supported Eapen's affair with Alice. Meanwhile, David and Sara are still in love and observe their "anniversary" in a romantic manner, supported by his driver and right-hand man Suku. DK, as David is known, is a rich planter and the Secretary of the Cosmo Club - the hangout of the rich and famous in the town of Kottayam. He has a close gang of friends at the club, which includes Rajagopal Kartha, Superintendent of Police, Kottayam and several  businessmen. Sara is a lecturer at the local college.

M.C Paul has grown in stature as a politician, having served as the Revenue Minister of the state and undisputed leader of the Malankara Congress party. He now aims to launch his son Dr. Benny Paul, who is a prominent youth leader. He has his eye on the Assembly seat in Kaduthuruthy constituency in Kottayam, which was vacated by incumbent Ummachan following allegations of corruption. Despite his popularity, Benny is facing a potential scandal related to the recent suicide of Archana, a student of the Kottayam Medical College. He publicly denies any relationship with her, but this is contested by Annie - Eapen's illegitimate daughter who is now under David and Sara's care. Annie was Archana's best friend and knew of her affair with Benny.

Benny is found dead in his home the next day, and Annie is believed to have killed him. She confides in David, stating that despite intending to kill Benny for denying his relationship with Archana, she arrived at his home only to find him dead already from a stab wound. David realizes that the Police-Politician nexus has already decided to frame Annie for the crime and also learns of evidence fabricated for the purpose. He uses his influence and resources to keep her away from the reach of the law until he can clear her name by finding the real culprit. He loses some of his closest friends in the process.

The rest of the action-thriller is about his quest to prove Annie's innocence and exposing the false idols in socio-politics in the town of Kottayam and the state itself.

Production
The film is produced by Rajan Doha under the banner of Horizon Entertainment. The locations of the film included Kottayam, Palai, Neriamangalam and Vagamon.

Cast

 Mammootty as David John Kottarathil / DK
 Bharat Gopy as Adv. Narayanan Swami
 Kalabhavan Mani as Sukumaran / Suku
 Biju Menon as Xavier Paul
 Lalu Alex as SP Rajagopal
 Vimala Raman as Sara Eapen
 Muktha as Annie
 Vijayaraghavan as M. C. Paul
 Maniyanpilla Raju as Kunjachan
 Captain Raju as Kottarathil John
 Baburaj as Zayed
 Arun as Dr. Benny Paul
 Jagathy Sreekumar as Ummachan
 Innocent as Father Pulikkoottil
 Janardhanan as Thampi
 Sadiq as CPO Aboobacker
 Devan as Thampan Joseph
 Rizabawa as Plappallil Eapen
 Bheeman Raghu as Jail Superintendent Rajeevan, a friendly and kindhearted officer 
 Augustine as Club attendant Peethambaran
 Babu Namboothiri as Mannanthala Varghese
 K. P. A. C. Lalitha as Mother Superior 
 Sukumari as Annamma Chettathi 
 Sreelatha Namboothiri as Kochammini Eapen
 Bindu Panicker as M. C. Paul's wife
 Zeenath as Jail Inmate
 Biju Pappan as Unni
 Radhika as Archana Shankar 
 Anil Murali as a club visitor
 Balachandran Chullikkadu as Advocate Mathews
 Ponnamma Babu as wedding guest 
 Santhosh Jogi as Chundan Baiju
 Reshmi Boban as Alice
 Gayathri
 Jija Surendran as a jail inmate
 Althara as Roma
 Ramesh Pisharody as Biju, channel reporter (cameo)
 P. Sreekumar as Jailor Chandran Pillai

Soundtrack 
The film's soundtrack contains two songs, both composed by Bijibal and lyrics by Anil Panachooran. The film's background score is done by Ouseppachan.

References

External links
 

2007 films
2000s Malayalam-language films
Films scored by Bijibal
Films directed by Joshiy